Mishutino is a rural locality (a village) in Pertsevskoye Rural Settlement, Gryazovetsky District, Vologda Oblast, Russia. The population was 26 as of 2002.

Geography 
Mishutino is located 30 km east of Gryazovets (the district's administrative centre) by road. Dyrovatovo is the nearest rural locality.

References 

Rural localities in Gryazovetsky District